Filmfare Awards Bangla is the Bengali segment of the annual Filmfare Awards, presented by The Times Group to honour the artistic and cinematic excellence in Bengali. The first installment of the awards were held for Bengali, Assamese and Odia films in a ceremony on 29 March 2007. The award ceremony was discontinued for Two Times respectively 2013, 2015 and 2016, then again continued from 2017 and now only given to Bengali Film Industry.

History 
On 8 March 2014, in a press conference held at Kolkata, the Worldwide Media group announced that Filmfare Award is debuting in Eastern India to honour the best cinematic artistic talent of the region. In the inaugural installment, awards in 29 categories would be given away at the Science City auditorium, Kolkata on 29 March 2014. The awards would include 21 trophies for Bengali movies and four each for Odia and Assamese films. The four categories for both Odia and Assamese films are Best Film, Best Director, Best Actor and Best Actress.
The winners would be selected from 102 entries in Bengali films, 36 and 14 entries respectively from the Odia and Assamese films.
Bengali film actor Prosenjit Chatterjee was present as the chief guest in that occasion. Thereafter two other press conferences followed in Bhubaneswar on 11 March and Guwahati on 14 March 2014 in the presence of Odia film actor Anubhav Mohanty and Assamese film actors Kopil Bora and Zerifa Wahid respectively. From 2017 the award is given only to Bengali film industry.

Winners 

1963

1964

1965

1966

1967

 1968

1969

1970

1971

1972

1973

1974

1975

1976

1977

1978

1979

1980

1981

1982

1983

1985

References

External links 
 

Indian film awards
Bengal film awards
Cinema of Assam
Cinema of Odisha
Events of The Times Group
2014 establishments in West Bengal
Awards established in 2014

See also 
Filmfare Award for Best Actress – Bangla